Chrisanthi Avgerou FBCS FAIS (born 1954) is a Greek-born British scholar in the field of the Social Study of Information Systems, focusing on Information Technology in developing countries. She is currently Professor of Information Systems at the London School of Economics and Political Science.

Avgerou is a Fellow of the British Computer Society and of the Association for Information Systems (AIS), associate editor of The Information Society journal and Information Systems research Journal, and has served as chairperson of the IFIP Technical Committee 9, which explores the relationship between computers and society

She has a BSc in mathematics from University of Athens, an MSc in computer science from the Loughborough University and a PhD in Information Systems from the London School of Economics.

Published books
 Avgerou, C., R. Mansell, D. Quah, and D. Silverstone (2007) The Oxford Handbook of Information and Communication Technologies, Oxford University Press.
 Perspectives and Policies on ICT in Society, Springer (2005) (co-edited with J. Berleur) .
 The Social Study of Information and Communication Technology, Oxford University Press (2004) (co-edited with C. Ciborra and F. Land) 
 Information systems and the economics of innovation, Cheltenham, Edward Elgar (2003) (co-edited with R. Lèbre LaRovere) .
 Information Systems and Global Diversity, Oxford, Oxford University Press (2002).
 Information Technology in Context: studies from the perspective of developing countries, London, Ashgate (2000) (co-edited with G. Walsham).
 Chrisanthi Avgerou and Tony Cornford, Developing Information Systems: Concepts, Issues and Practice, 2nd Edition, Palgrave (1998), .

References

External links
 

Living people
Greek emigrants to England
Greek academics
Academics of the London School of Economics
Alumni of Loughborough University
Fellows of the British Computer Society
1954 births
Greek women scientists
British women scientists
National and Kapodistrian University of Athens alumni
People from Volos